Gerard Laws (born November 16, 1989) is an Australian professional Canadian football placekicker and punter (football) who is currently a free agent.

Biography
Gerard Laws was born on November 16, 1989, in Australia. He is a product of Prokick Australia which has produced many NCAA Division 1 punters and some have moved on to the National Football League and Canadian Football League. In 2015, he played for the California Sharks in the AAA Professional Football League and from 2016-19, he played for the Sydney Uni Lions. In April 2021, he signed his first contract with the Calgary Stampeders of the Canadian Football League (CFL). He was released on July 19, 2021.

References

External links
Media Day July 13, 2021

1989 births
Living people
Canadian football placekickers
Canadian football punters
Australian players of Canadian football